The Ussuri or Wusuli is a river that runs through Khabarovsk and Primorsky Krais, Russia and the southeast region of Northeast China. It rises in the Sikhote-Alin mountain range, flowing north and forming part of the Sino-Russian border (which is based on the Sino-Russian Convention of Peking of 1860), until it joins the Amur as a tributary to it near Khabarovsk. Its waters come from rain (60%), snow (30–35%), and subterranean springs.

Names

The Ussuri has been known by many names. In Manchu, it was called the Usuri Ula or Dobi Bira (River of Foxes) and in Mongolian the Üssüri Müren. Ussuri is Manchu for soot-black river.

History
 The Ussuri has a reputation for catastrophic floods. It freezes up in November and stays under the ice until April. The river teems with different kinds of fish: grayling, sturgeon, humpback salmon (gorbusha), chum salmon (keta), and others.
 During World War II, the river marked one of the boundaries which Soviet forces crossed into Manchuria in Operation August Storm in 1945.
 The Sino-Soviet border conflict of 1969 took place at the Soviet Damansky Island on the Ussuri River.

Tributaries
Major tributaries of the Ussuri are, from source to mouth:
Arsenyevka (left)
Sungacha (left)
Muling (left)
Bolshaya Ussurka (right)
Bikin (right)
Naoli (left)
Khor (right)

See also
 Ussuri brown bear
 Ussurian tiger

References

Sources

External links
Article containing a detail map[dead link as of 18 March 2017]
http://www.unu.edu/unupress/unupbooks/80349e/80349E10.GIF

Rivers of Khabarovsk Krai
Rivers of Primorsky Krai
Rivers of Heilongjiang
Border rivers
China–Russia border
International rivers of Asia